Sloane U'Ren is a British-American Director, Art Director, and Set Designer based in the UK. In 2012 she made her directorial debut with the multi-award winning feature film Dimensions (2011 film), aka Dimensions: A Line, A Loop, A Tangle of Threads. Dimensions was voted Best Film 2012 at the 37th Boston Science Fiction Film Festival and awarded the Gort Award. Previous Gort Award winners have included Duncan Jones' Moon. Dimensions went on to win Best Film at the London Independent Film Festival and Best Film at the Long Island International Film Expo. U'Ren was also awarded Best Director at the Long Island International Film Expo.

She is married to the English screenwriter and composer Ant Neely.

Partial filmography
 Dimensions (2012) - Director
 Shanghai (2010) - Art Director
 Harry Potter and the Half Blood Prince (2009) - Art Director
 Tsunami: The Aftermath (2006) - Art Director
 The Good Shepherd (2006) - Assistant Art Director
 Batman Begins (2006) - Assistant Art Director
 Six Feet Under (2003) - Set Designer (12 Episodes)
 Open Range (2003) - Set Designer
 Ali (2001) - Set Designer
 The Patriot (2000) - Set Designer
 Mission: Impossible 2 (2000) - Set Designer
 Scream 3 (2000) - Set Designer
 Being John Malkovich (1999) - Set Designer

External links

References

American art directors
American emigrants to England
American women film directors
Living people
Year of birth missing (living people)